was a semi-dreadnought battleship built for the Imperial Japanese Navy (IJN) in the first decade of the 20th century. Lead ship of her class, she was the first battleship built in Japan. She was named for Satsuma Province, now a part of Kagoshima prefecture. The ship saw no combat during World War I, although she led a squadron that occupied several German colonies in the Pacific Ocean in 1914. Satsuma was disarmed and sunk as a target in 1922–1924 in accordance with the terms of the Washington Naval Treaty of 1922.

Background
The Satsuma class was ordered in late 1904 under the 1904 War Naval Supplementary Program during the Russo-Japanese War. Unlike the previous  pre-dreadnought battleships, they were the first battleships ordered from Japanese shipyards, although Satsuma used many imported components. They were originally designed with a dozen  guns, but had to be redesigned because of a shortage of guns in Japan and to reduce costs.

Design and description

She displaced  at normal load. The crew ranged from 800 to 940 officers and enlisted men.

Satsuma was powered by a pair of vertical triple-expansion steam engines, each driving one propeller, using steam generated by 20 Miyabara water-tube boilers using a mixture of coal and fuel oil.

The ship was completed with four 45-caliber 12-inch 41st Year Type guns in two gun turrets, one each fore and aft of the superstructure. The intermediate armament consisted of six twin-gun turrets equipped with 45-caliber Type 41 10-inch (254 mm) guns, three turrets on each side of the superstructure. Her heavy intermediate armament is why the ship is considered a semi-dreadnought.

Satsuma was equipped with a dozen 40-caliber quick-firing (QF) 4.7-inch (120 mm) 41st Year Type guns, mounted in casemates in the sides of the hull. The ship was also equipped with four 40-caliber QF 12-pounder 12-cwt guns and four 28-caliber QF 12-pounder guns. In addition, she was fitted with five submerged  torpedo tubes, two on each broadside and one in the stern.

The waterline main belt of the Satsuma-class vessels consisted of Krupp cemented armor that had a maximum thickness of  amidships. It tapered to a thickness of  inches at the ends of the ship. A  strake of armor protected the casemates. The armor of Satsumas main gun turrets had a maximum thickness of nine inches.

Construction and career
Satsuma, named for Satsuma Province, was laid down at Yokosuka Naval Arsenal on 15 May 1905. She was launched on 15 November 1906 with Emperor Meiji, the Navy Minister, and other high officials on hand for the ceremony, and completed on 25 March 1910. At the time of her launching, Satsuma had the largest displacement of any battleship in the world.

On 5 August 1911, the ship suffered an explosion in one of her 12-inch guns when it failed to fire during gunnery practice. After some time passed, the breech was opened and ignited the propellant; the resulting fire killed 16 crewmen and several officers.

She was lightly damaged by a typhoon on 22 September 1912. Satsuma was assigned to the 1st Battleship Squadron when World War I began in August 1914. She served as Rear Admiral Tatsuo Matsumura's flagship in the Second South Seas Squadron as it seized the German possessions of the Caroline and the Palau Islands in October 1914.

Satsuma rejoined the 1st Battleship Squadron in 1915, was refitted at Sasebo Naval Arsenal in 1916 and served with the 1st Squadron for the rest of the war. Sometime during the war, she was fitted with two 12-pounders on high-angle mounts to serve as anti-aircraft guns.

The ship was disarmed at Yokosuka Naval Arsenal in 1922 to comply with the provisions of the Washington Naval Treaty, stricken from the Navy List on 20 September 1923 and converted into a target ship.

Notes

Footnotes

References

External links

New York Times article on launch

Satsuma-class battleships
Ships built by Yokosuka Naval Arsenal
1906 ships
World War I battleships of Japan
Shipwrecks in the Pacific Ocean
Ships sunk as targets
Maritime incidents in 1924